Classification of railway accidents, both in terms of cause and effect, is a valuable aid in studying rail (and other) accidents to help to prevent similar ones occurring in the future.  Systematic investigation for over 150 years has led to the railways' excellent safety record (compared, for example, with road transport).

Ludwig von Stockert (1913) proposed a classification of accidents by their effects (consequences); e.g. head-on-collisions, rear-end collisions, derailments. Schneider and Mase (1968) proposed an additional classification by causes; e.g. driver's errors, signalmen's errors, mechanical faults.  Similar categorisations had been made by implication in previous books e.g. Rolt (1956), but Stockert's and Schneider/Mase's are more systematic and complete.  With minor changes, they represent best knowledge.

Classification of rail accidents by effects 
 Collisions
 Collisions with trains:
 Head-on collision
 Rear-end collision
 Slanting collision 
 Collisions with buffer stops (overrunning end of track)
 Collisions with obstructions on the track (may also cause derailment)
 Collision with landslips (in cuttings)

Derailments
 By location:
 Plain track
 Curves
 Junctions

Other
 Fires, explosions and release of hazardous chemicals (including sabotage/terrorism)
 People falling from trains, collisions with people on tracks

Classification of rail accidents by causes

Drivers' errors
 Passing signals at danger
 Excessive speed
 Mishandling of the engine (e.g. boiler explosions)
 Failure to check brakes and safety systems as well as sand reserve
 Failure to stop at required positions, e.g. level crossings with defective equipment or shunting movements that lead to occupied tracks.

Signalmen's errors
 Allowing two trains into same occupied block section
 Incorrect operation of signals, points or token equipment

(Mechanical) failure of rolling stock
 Poor design
 Poor maintenance
 Undetected damage
 Overloading or freight that is not adequately secured.
 Fire starting from combustion motors, electric cables or equipment, leaking fuel or cooling oil

Civil engineering failure
 Track (permanent way) faults
 Bridge and tunnel collapses
 Poor track or junction layout

Acts of other people
 Other railway personnel (shunters, porters, maintenance personnel, etc.)
 Non-railway personnel
 Accidental
 Accidental track obstruction e.g. with road vehicles or by working construction vehicles
 Deliberate (vandalism, terrorism, suicide, extortion, sabotage)
 Deliberate track obstruction, e.g. with road vehicles or (heavy) objects
 Intentional damage to infrastructure like tracks, points or signals
 Level crossing misuse
 Trespassing

Natural causes
 Track obstruction or damage by landslides, avalanches, floods, trees
 Fog or snow that obscure signals or the current position of the train
 Wet leaves (or their remains) making the tracks slippery.

Contributory factors
 Strength of rolling stock
 Fire hazards or dangerous goods in the train, in involved road vehicles or the vicinity
 Effectiveness of brakes
 Inadequate rules

References 
 Ludwig von Stockert (1913), Eisenbahnunfalle (Railway Accidents - a contribution to railway operating technology).  Leipzig 1913.
 
   Later editions available.

Rail transport classification systems